15 minutes of fame is short-lived media publicity or celebrity of an individual or phenomenon. The expression was inspired by a quotation misattributed to Andy Warhol: "In the future, everyone will be world-famous for 15 minutes." Attributed to two other people, the first printed use was in the program for a 1968 exhibition of Warhol's work at the Moderna Museet in Stockholm, Sweden. The phenomenon is often used in reference to figures in the entertainment industry or other areas of popular culture, such as reality television and YouTube.

An older version of the same concept in English is the expression "nine days' wonder." This phrase dates at least as far back as the Elizabethan era, referencing William Kempe.

Origins
Warhol's alleged quotation first appeared in print in a program for his 1968 exhibit at the Moderna Museet in Stockholm, Sweden. In the autumn of 1967, Pontus Hultén (the director for the Moderna Museet) asked Olle Granath to help with the production of the exhibit, which was due to open in February 1968. Granath was tasked with writing a program for the exhibit, complete with Swedish translations. He was given a box of writings by and about Warhol to use for the program. Granath claims that submitting his manuscript, Hultén asked him to insert the quote: "In the future, everyone will be world-famous for 15 minutes." To which Granath replied that quote was not in the material he was given. Hultén replied, "if he didn’t say it, he could very well have said it. Let’s put it in."

Photographer Nat Finkelstein claimed credit for the expression, stating that he was photographing Warhol in 1966 for a proposed book. A crowd gathered trying to get into the pictures and Warhol supposedly remarked that everyone wants to be famous, to which Finkelstein replied, "Yeah, for about fifteen minutes, Andy."

Interpretation
German art historian Benjamin H. D. Buchloh suggests that the core tenet of Warhol's aesthetic, being "the systematic invalidation of the hierarchies of representational functions and techniques" of art, corresponds directly to the belief that the "hierarchy of subjects worthy to be represented will someday be abolished;" hence, anybody, and therefore "everybody," can be famous once that hierarchy dissipates, "in the future," and by logical extension of that, "in the future, everybody will be famous," and not merely those individuals worthy of fame.

On the other hand, wide proliferation of the adapted idiom "my fifteen minutes" and its entrance into common parlance have led to a slightly different application, having to do with both the ephemerality of fame in the information age and, more recently, the democratization of media outlets brought about by the advent of the internet. In this formulation, Warhol's quote has been taken to mean: "At the present, because there are so many channels by which an individual might attain fame, albeit not enduring fame, virtually anyone can become famous for a brief period of time."

There is a third and even more remote interpretation of the term, as used by an individual who has been legitimately famous or skirted celebrity for a brief period of time, that period of time being their "fifteen minutes."

John Langer suggests that 15 minutes of fame is an enduring concept because it permits everyday activities to become "great effects." Tabloid journalism and the paparazzi have accelerated this trend, turning what may have before been isolated coverage into continuing media coverage even after the initial reason for media interest has passed.

Derivative phrases

On their 1987 album Yoyo, Bourgeois Tagg have a song called "15 Minutes In The Sun" that is a direct reference to the Warhol statement. 

In the song "I Can't Read", released by David Bowie's Tin Machine in their 1989 debut album and re-released by Bowie in 1997 for the soundtrack of the movie The Ice Storm, the phrase is used in direct reference to Andy Warhol: "Andy, where's my 15 minutes?" 
The age of reality television has seen the comment wryly updated as: "In the future, everyone will be obscure for 15 minutes." The British artist Banksy has made a sculpture of a TV that has, written on its screen, "In the future, everyone will be anonymous for 15 minutes," which was later used in the lyrics of Robbie Williams' song "The Actor" from his 2006 album Rudebox.

A more recent adaptation of Warhol's quip, possibly prompted by the rise of online social networking, blogging, and internet celebrity, is the claim that "In the future, everyone will be famous to fifteen people" or, in some renditions, "On the Web, everyone will be famous to fifteen people". This quote, though attributed to David Weinberger, was said to have originated with the Scottish artist Momus.

The Marilyn Manson song "I Don't Like the Drugs (But the Drugs Like Me)", released on his 1998 album Mechanical Animals, alludes to the term in the line "We're rehabbed and we're ready for our fifteen minutes of shame", as part of the song's theme of unrepentant escapism through drugs.

In 1993, the British techno/industrial music group Sheep on Drugs released a single "15 Minutes of Fame" which reached the lower reaches of the UK Singles Chart.

Musician and actor Tim Minchin refers to the phrase (and to Warhol explicitly) in his song "15 minutes", wherein the phrase "15 minutes of shame" is sung repeatedly to describe the phenomenon of online shaming.

See also
 Andy Warhol's Fifteen Minutes, talk show on MTV
 Big in Japan (phrase)
 Fad
 Famous for being famous
 Internet meme
 It girl
 One-hit wonder
 Real life
 Reality television
 World famous in New Zealand
 Wikipedia policy: Subjects notable only for one event

Notes

References
 Guinn, Jeff and Douglas Perry (2005). The Sixteenth Minute: Life In the Aftermath of Fame. New York, Jeremy F. Tarcher/Penguin (a member of The Penguin Group). .
 Patterson, Dale (2013). Fifteen Minutes of Fame: History's One-Hit Wonders. Red Deer Press. .

External links

English phrases
Popular culture language
Popularity
Andy Warhol
Celebrity
Matthew effect
1968 neologisms
Social influence